The French destroyer Opiniâtre was one of four s that was built for the Argentine Navy in the early 1910s. The ships were taken over by the French Navy after the start of the First World War in August 1914. She was scrapped in 1935.

Design and description 

Their crew numbered 140 men.

The ships were powered by a pair of Rateau steam turbines, each driving one propeller shaft using steam provided by five mixed-firing Foster-Wheeler boilers.

The primary armament of the Aventurier-class ships consisted of four  guns in single mounts, one on the forecastle, one between the funnels, and two on the quarterdeck, in front and behind the searchlight platform. They were fitted with a  AA gun for anti-aircraft defence. The ships were also equipped with four single mounts for  torpedo tubes amidships.

Construction and career
Opinâtre was ordered from Dyle et Bacalan and was launched in 1911 with the name of La Rioja at its Bordeaux shipyard. The ship was completed on 16 September 1914. She was struck in 1933 and broken up for scrap in 1935.

Citations

References

1911 ships
Aventurier-class destroyers
Ships built by Dyle et Bacalan